The Academic Bookstore (Finnish: ,) is a Finnish chain of bookstores. It has both physical outlets as well as an online presence.

Stockmann sold the chain in 2015 to Bonnier Group. Originally founded as an independent chain, it was bought out by Stockmann in 1930. Its revenue in 2015 was about 40 million euros.

History 

The Academic Bookstore was founded in 1893. Its goal was "to serve equally the needs of researchers and the general public, and which, fairly looking after the interests of domestic publishing, working to establish faster and more secure links with the foreign book market". The first store was located on Aleksanterinkatu in Helsinki.

In 1901 the bookstore moved to a new location on the same street, enabling it to sell 1200 titles simultaneously.

Another move was made in 1910.

Stockmann bought the Academic Bookstore in 1930. The new owner soon moved it to the new Stockmann department store at Helsinki centre.

In 1969 a new  location was established, where it still remains, at the Alvar Aalto-designed Kirjatalo.

The Academic Bookstore was part of the Info bookstore chain from 1978 to 1985. An electronic magazine ordering system was set up in 1975. In 1984 its sales were computerized.

Previously the chain has operated at Lahti (1971–1983), Jyväskylä (1983–1997), Joensuu (1992–1997), Lappeenranta (1980–1997), Kuopio (1996–1997) and Vaasa (1996–1997) with the intention of operating in all Finnish cities with higher education. These stores were transferred to Suomalainen Kirjakauppa in 1998. Instead, Stockmann decided to focus on cities with its department stores.

In 2015, Stockmann sold the chain to the Swedish Bonnier Group.

Retail outlets 
The Academic Bookstore currently has five stores. Two of these are in Helsinki (the flagship store in the city centre, and another one at Itäkeskus opened in 1992), while the others are in Tapiola (opened in 1990), Tampere (1983) and Turku (1982–).

Previous locations included Joensuu, Jyväskylä (twice), Kuopio, Lahti, Lappeenranta, Oulu, Vaasassa and Vantaa (closed in 2019).

The webstore has been open since 1999.

References 

Bookstores of Finland
1893 establishments in Finland